Sir John Seymour, Knight banneret (c. 1474 – 21 December 1536) was an English soldier and a courtier who served both Henry VII and Henry VIII. Born into a prominent gentry family, he is best known as the father of Henry VIII's third wife, Jane Seymour, and hence grandfather of king Edward VI of England.

Family
The Seymours were descendants of an Anglo-Norman family that took its name from St. Maur-sur-Loire in Touraine.  William de St. Maur in 1240 held the manors of Penhow and Woundy (now called Undy) in Monmouthshire. William's great-grandson, Sir Roger de St. Maur, had two sons: John, whose granddaughter conveyed these manors by marriage into the family of Bowlay of Penhow, who bore the Seymour arms; and Sir Roger (c. 1308 – before 1366), who married Cicely, eldest sister and heir of John de Beauchamp, 3rd Baron Beauchamp. Cicely brought to the Seymours the manor of Hache, Somerset, and her grandson, Roger Seymour, by his marriage with Maud, daughter and heir of Sir William Esturmy, acquired Wulfhall (or Wolf Hall) in the parish of Great Bedwyn in the Savernake Forest, Wiltshire. Sir John Seymour was a great-great-grandson of this Roger Seymour.

Sir John Seymour was born around 1474, the eldest son of John Seymour (c. 1450 – 26 October 1491) of Wulfhall, by his marriage to Elizabeth Darell (or Darrell) (born c. 1451). He married Margery, the daughter of Sir Henry Wentworth of Nettlestead, Suffolk, and his wife Anne Say. Anne was the daughter of Sir John Say and his wife, Elizabeth, daughter of Lawrence Cheney (or Cheyne) (c.1396–1461) and Elizabeth Cokayne. Margery Wentworth's grandfather, Sir Philip Wentworth, had married Mary, daughter of John Clifford, 7th Baron de Clifford, whose mother Elizabeth was daughter of Henry Percy (Hotspur) and great-great-granddaughter of Edward III. Margery was renowned for her beauty as well as her quiet and gentle demeanour, and she came to the attention of the poet John Skelton.

Career
Seymour succeeded his father in 1492 and was knighted in the field by Henry VII for his services against the Cornish rebels at Blackheath on 17 June 1497. He was made Knight banneret in 1513. He was present at the sieges of Thérouanne and Tournay in 1513 as well as the two meetings between Henry VIII and Francis I: the Field of the Cloth of Gold in 1520, and again in 1532.

Offices held
His offices included:
 Warden, Savernake Forest, Wiltshire October 1491
 Sheriff, Wiltshire 1498–1499, 1507–1508, 1518–19, 1524 – January 1526
 Sheriff of Somerset and Dorset 1515–1516, 1526–1527
 Justice of the peace Wiltshire 1499–1536
 Steward, Edward Stafford, 3rd Duke of Buckingham's lands, Wiltshire by 1503
 Knight of the body by 1509
 Constable and door-ward, Bristol Castle, Gloucestershire August 1509, jointly. (with son Edward) July 1517
 Under captain, Dragon of Greenwich 1512
 Commissioner subsidy, Wiltshire 1512, 1514, 1515, Wiltshire and Salisbury 1523
 Commissioner musters, Wiltshire 1513
 Commissioner loan 1524
 Steward, manor of Kingston Lisle, Berkshire before 1513
 Forester, Grovely, Wiltshire February 1526
 Groom of the Bedchamber 1532

Marriage and issue

Sir John Seymour married Margery Wentworth (c.1478–18 October 1550) on 22 October 1494. The couple had ten children:
 John Seymour (died 15 July 1510), eldest son and heir apparent who predeceased his father without progeny. His monumental brass survives set into the floor of Great Bedwyn church, inscribed as follows:
"Here lyeth the body of John Seymour sonne and here of Sr John Seymour, Knight, & of Margery oon of the daughters of Sr Henry Wentworth, Knight, which decessed ye xv day of July the yer of or Lord MVCX on whos soule Jh(es)u have m(er)cy & of yor charitie say a Pater Nost(er) &  Ave (Maria)" 
 Edward Seymour, 1st Duke of Somerset, Lord Protector of Edward VI (c. 1500 – 22 January 1552) married firstly Catherine, daughter of Sir William Filliol and secondly Anne, daughter of Sir Edward Stanhope
 Sir Henry Seymour (1503–1578) married Barbara, daughter of Morgan Wolfe
 Thomas Seymour, 1st Baron Seymour of Sudeley (c. 1508 – 20 March 1549) married Catherine Parr, widow of Henry VIII
 John Seymour (died young)
 Anthony Seymour (died c. 1528)
 Jane Seymour, queen Consort of Henry VIII (c. 1509 – 24 October 1537)
 Margery Seymour (died c. 1528)
 Elizabeth Seymour, Lady Cromwell (c. 1518 – 19 March 1568) through whom Sir John Seymour is an ancestor of actor Danny Dyer
 Dorothy Seymour, Lady Smith (c. 1520–1574) married firstly, Sir Clement Smith (c. 1515 – 26 August 1552), MP, of Little Baddow, Essex and secondly, Thomas Leventhorpe of Shingle Hall, Hertfordshire

Of the ten children born at Wulfhall, six survived – three sons: Edward, Henry and Thomas, and three daughters: Jane, Elizabeth and Dorothy. Edward, Thomas, Jane and Elizabeth were courtiers. Edward and Thomas would both be executed during the reign of Edward VI. Henry Seymour, who lacked his brothers' ambition, lived away from court in relative obscurity.

Seymour also had an illegitimate son: 
 Sir John Seymour (c. 1530 – before August 1599), married in March 1568 Jane or Joan Poyntz, daughter of Sir Nicholas Poyntz and Joan Berkeley.

Notable children
Four of the Seymour children achieved prominence at the royal court: Edward, Thomas, Jane and Elizabeth.

Jane Seymour, the eldest surviving daughter, was a maid of honour to Henry's first wife, Catherine of Aragon, and later to Anne Boleyn. Henry VIII stayed at Wulfhall with Queen Anne in the summer of 1535 for a few days. In early 1536, Henry declared his love for Jane and began spending increasing amounts of time with her, chaperoned by her brother, Edward. Henry and Jane were formally betrothed the day after Anne Boleyn was arrested and executed on charges of treason, adultery and incest. After Jane became queen on 30 May 1536, her family scaled the social ranks, as was befitting the family of a royal consort.

Her eldest brother, Edward, was made an earl and eventually a duke and briefly ruled England on behalf of his nephew, King Edward VI. Her second brother, Thomas, was made a baron and Lord High Admiral, and in 1547 eloped with Henry VIII's widow, Queen Catherine Parr. Both Edward and Thomas were beheaded for treason, a few years apart.

Seymour's second daughter, Elizabeth, was first married to Sir Anthony Ughtred (c.1478 – 1534), secondly to Gregory Cromwell (c.1520 – 1551), son of Henry VIII's chief minister, Thomas Cromwell, and for a third time to John Paulet, Baron St John (c.1510 – 1576), who succeeded his father as Marquess of Winchester in 1572.

Death and burial

Seymour died on 21 December 1536. By royal custom, his daughter Queen Jane did not attend the funeral. He was first buried in the church of Easton Priory, but following the collapse of that building was reburied in 1590 by his grandson, Edward Seymour, 1st Earl of Hertford, in St Mary's Church, Great Bedwyn, the parish church of Wulfhall, where his monument survives. The monument gives his age at death as sixty: 

His eldest son and heir, Edward Seymour, inherited lands producing an income of £275 a year, .

Monument, Great Bedwyn 

His monument in Great Bedwyn church consists of a chest tomb displaying heraldic escutcheons, surmounted by his recumbent effigy, fully dressed in armour with hands in prayer, his head resting on his helm from which projects the sculpted Seymour crest of a pair of wings. His feet rest on a lion and a sword lies by his side. On the wall above is fixed a tablet inscribed as follows:
"Here lyeth intombed the worthie Sr John Seymour of Wolfhall, Knight, who by Margerie his wyfe, daughter of Sr Henry Wentworthe, Knight, from whome the nowe Lorde Wentworthe is discended, had sixe sonnes and fower daughters, to wete, John who dyed unmaryed; Edwarde, Duke of Somerset, Earl of Hertforde, Vicount Beauchampe and Baron Seymour, uncle to Kinge Edwarde the Sixt, Governor of his Royall Person, Protector of all his Dominions and Subjects, Lorde Treasorer and Earle Marshall of Englande; w(i)ch Duke maryed Anne, daughter of Sr Edwarde Stanhope, Knight, by Elizabeth his wyfe, daughter of Sr Foulke Burgchier, Lorde Filzwaryn, (sic) from whome the moderne Earles of Bathe are discended; Sr Henry Seymour, Knight, who maried Barbara daughter of Thomas Morgan, Esquier; Thomas Lorde Seymour of Sudeley, Highe Admirall of Englande, who maryed Katherine, Queene of Englande, and wydow to Kinge Henry the Eight. One other Jhon, and Anthony, who dyed in theire infancy. Jane Qveene of Englande, wyfe to Kynge Henry the Eight, and mother to Kynge Edwarde the Sixt; Elizabeth, firste maryed to Sr Henry Ughtred,(sic) Knight, after to Gregorie, Lorde Cromwell, and last to Jhon Lorde Sainct John of Basinge,(sic) after Marquesse of Winchester; Margery, who dyed in her infancy, and Dorothe, maryed to Sr Clement Smythe, Knight. This Knight departed this lyfe at LX yeares of age, the XXI day of December, Anno 1536, and was firste buryed at Eston Priorie Churche amongst divers of his auncestors, bothe Seymours and Sturmyes. Howbeit that Churche beinge ruyned, and thereby all theire monumentes either whollie spoyled, or verie much defased duringe the mynoritie of Edwarde, Earle of Hertforde, sonne to the said Duke, the said Earle after, as well for the dutyfull love he beareth to his said grandefather, as for the better contynuans of his memory, did cause his bodie to be removed, and here to be intombed at his own coste and chardge, the laste daye of September, Anno 1590, in the XXXII yeare of the moste happye raigne of our gratious Soveraigne Ladie Queene Elizabeth."
A transcript was made of the inscriptions of the Seymour monuments by the topographer John Aubrey on his visit to the church in 1672, who also recorded the heraldry on the monument at that date, much of which has been lost.

Arms

The arms of Seymour are blazoned Gules, two wings conjoined in lure or.

Notes

References

Attribution

External links
 Seymour, Sir John (1473/74-1536), of Wolf Hall, Wilts. Biography at History of Parliament Online
 Seymour Family Pedigree of the Seymour family at tudorplace.com
 

High Sheriffs of Somerset
High Sheriffs of Wiltshire
1470s births
1536 deaths
Year of birth uncertain
John, 1536
16th-century English people
Knights banneret of England
High Sheriffs of Dorset